Fernanda Costa Campos Cotote (born 24 September 1986) is a Brazilian actress. She is most known for playing the lead role, Morena, in the telenovela Salve Jorge.

Biography
Costa was born in Paraty, Rio de Janeiro state, She has Lebanese ancestry through her maternal grandmother. In interviews, she has stated that she is bisexual and has known since she was a teenager. Discreet in her personal life, she is rarely seen in the press.
Nanda Costa discussed her 5-year relationship with Lan Lahn in an interview. Together they wrote a song titled 'Aponte,' which was recorded by the singer Maria Bethania in 2017. More recently Costa and Lanh wrote a song titled 'Não é Comum, mas é normal' that could be translated as 'It's not usual but it's normal,' about LGBTQ representation.

Career 
She played her first role in the 2006 Rede Globo telenovela Cobras & Lagartos, in which she starred as the antagonist Madá. After participating in 2008 in the Globo's special Por Toda Minha Vida and in one episode of Ó Paí, Ó. In 2009, she played in Viver a Vida as Soraia. Nanda Costa was nominated for several awards for her role as the prostitute Jéssica in the 2010 film Sonhos Roubados. Costa participated in the same year of one episode of Clandestinos - O Sonho Começou, character also named Nanda. In 2011, she played the antagonist Lilica in the telenovela Cordel Encantado by Duca Rachid and Thelma Guedes. Nanda Costa played the lead role, Morena, a victim of human trafficking, in the 2012 Rede Globo telenovela Salve Jorge by Glória Perez.

Filmography

Television

Film

Stage

Awards and nominations

 2007 - (Nominated) Quality Award Brazil - Best Actress Breakthrough for Cobras & Lagartos.
 2007 - (Nominated) Contigo Prize! TV - Best Actress Breakthrough for Cobras & Lagartos.
 2008 - (Nominated) Quality Award Brazil - Best Actress Breakthrough for Bezerra de Menezes: O Diário de um Espírito.
 2010 - Rio de Janeiro International Film Festival - Best Actress for Sonhos Roubados.
 2010 - Brazilian Film Festival of Paris - best actress for Sonhos Roubados.
 2010 - Brazilian Film Festival of Miami - Best Actress for Sonhos Roubados.
 2010 - Festival of Biarritz  - best actress for Sonhos Roubados.
 2011 - Paulinia Film Festival - Best Actress for Febre do Rato.
 2012 - (Nominated) Guarani Brazilian Cinema Award - best actress for Febre do Rato.
 2013 - (Nominated) Grand Prix of Brazilian Cinema - best actress for Febre do Rato.
 2013 - (Nominated) for Contigo Award ! TV - best actress for Salve Jorge.
 2013 - (Nominated) for Extra Award for Television - best actress for Salve Jorge.
 2013 - (Nominated) for UOL awards - best actress for Salve Jorge.
 2013 - (Nominated) Award Quem de Televisão - best actress for Salve Jorge.
 2014 - (Nominated) Troféu Internet award - best actress for Salve Jorge.
 2018 - (Nominated) 19th Latin Grammy Awards - best portuguese language song for "Aponte".

References

External links
 

1986 births
Living people
Actors from Rio de Janeiro (state)
Brazilian film actresses
Brazilian stage actresses
Brazilian telenovela actresses
Brazilian people of Lebanese descent
Bisexual actresses
Brazilian bisexual people
Brazilian LGBT actors
People from Paraty